Andrija Ćorić (born 1 February 1995) is a Croatian professional basketball player, currently playing as a forward.

External links
 Profile at abaliga.com
 Profile at eurobasket.com 
 Profile at FIBA
 Profile at realgm.com

1995 births
Living people
Croatian men's basketball players
Croatian people of Belgian descent
Forwards (basketball)
HKK Široki players
KK Cibona players
KK Cedevita players
KK Vrijednosnice Osijek players
Sportspeople from Antwerp